Orxeta is a small town and municipality in the comarca of Marina Baixa in the Valencian Community, Spain.

Municipalities in the Province of Alicante
Marina Baixa